The Shire of Mckinlay is a local government area in outback north-western Queensland, Australia.

The shire economy is based on beef production and mining. BHP operate the Cannington Mine in the shire, extracting silver, lead and zinc.

History 
Wanamarra (also known as Maykulan and Wunumura is an Australian Aboriginal language in North West Queensland. The language region includes areas within the Shire of McKinlay, Shire of Cloncurry and Shire of Richmond, including the Flinders River area, and the towns of Kynuna and Richmond. The Mackinlay Division was created on 9 December 1891 out of parts of Boulia and Cloncurry under the Divisional Boards Act 1887.

With the passage of the Local Authorities Act 1902, Mackinlay Division became the Shire of Mackinlay on 31 March 1903.

In 1932, the spelling of the shire's name was altered to be Shire of Mckinlay, as the shire was named after the explorer John McKinlay.

On 24 July 1930, it was abolished and a new Shire of Mckinlay was formed from parts of the Shires of Cloncurry, Mckinlay, Winton and Wyangarie (Richmond).

Towns and localities 
The Shire of McKinlay includes the following settlements:

 Julia Creek
 Cannington
 Kynuna
 McKinlay
 Nelia

Amenities 
The Mckinlay Shire Council operates public libraries at Julia Creek and McKinlay.

Chairmen and mayors

 1927: W. M. Allison
 2008–2012: Paul Woodhouse
 2012–2020 : Belinda Murphy
2020–present: Philip Roland Curr

Population

References

 
Mckinlay Shire
1891 establishments in Australia
North West Queensland